Castellanos de Villiquera is a municipality in the province of Salamanca,  western Spain, part of the autonomous community of Castile-Leon.

The post code is 37797.

Geography
The municipality contains the hamlets La Mata de Armuña (83 people) Carbajosa de Armuña (52 people) and Mozodiel de Sanchíñigo (18 people).

References

Municipalities in the Province of Salamanca